Arthur Ashe Kids' Day  is an annual tennis/children's event that takes place in the end of August at the United States Tennis Association at Arthur Ashe Stadium. (USTA) Center in Flushing Meadows, Queens, New York. It is sponsored by IBM and the USTA. This event also begins the U.S. Open, which officially starts one day later. This event was also televised on CBS the following day, until 2014 when it lost U.S. Open broadcast rights to ESPN. Beginning in 2015, the event airs on ESPN2. It is a celebration of the memory of Arthur Ashe, who died of AIDS in 1993, and of his efforts to help young people through tennis. Kids’ Day began in 1993, the year that Ashe died.

At the 2005 event, the United States Postal Service unveiled and issued the Arthur Ashe Commemorative Postal Stamp in the presence of the Ashe family. The 2011 event originally scheduled for August 27, 2011 was cancelled in the wake of the forthcoming Hurricane Irene. This marked the first time the event was cancelled in advance.

Participants at the Arthur Ashe Kids Day have an opportunity to play and/or watch numerous tennis matches before and after the main event at Arthur Ashe Stadium at the USTA Center. The main event at the stadium consists of a concert and tennis matches. As people enter the stadium, they are handed hats to commemorate the event.

Tennis greats that have appeared annually at Arthur Ashe Kids Day include Venus and Serena Williams, Roger Federer, Rafael Nadal, Andre Agassi, Andy Roddick, Novak Djokovic, Kim Clijsters, and Anna Kournikova, who play to entertain the children and families and to raise money for charity. Kids Day has been hosted by MTV VJ Quddus and sportscaster and ‘’Figure It Out’’ host Summer Sanders. Many popular singers have also performed at Kids Day, including Britney Spears, Jessica Simpson, 98 Degrees, Bow Wow, Ne-Yo, Jesse McCartney, Justin Bieber, Rihanna, O Town, JoJo, Monica, Jonas Brothers, Ariana Grande, and many others. During the day many tennis stars sign autographs and take pictures with the children.

Events

Notes

References

External links
Official website
The USTA
The U.S. Open

US Open (tennis)
Recurring events established in 1993